Girija (born 18 September 1975), known by her screen name Shruti, is an Indian actress, television personality and politician. As an actress, she  predominantly appears in Kannada film industry. She is currently serving as chief secretary of Bharatiya Janata Party's women's wing in its Karnataka cadre.

In addition to Kannada, Shruti has appeared in a handful of Telugu, Tamil and Malayalam films. She was among the leading actresses in Kannada cinema during the 1990s and has won three Karnataka State Film Awards and four Filmfare Awards South in her career spanning over 25 years. She is known for performance in films such as Gauri Ganesha (1991), Aagatha (1995), Kalki (1996), Gowdru (2004), Akka Thangi (2008) and Puttakkana Highway (2011). She is sister of actor Sharan. In 2016, she won the third season of the reality television show Bigg Boss Kannada.

Shruti joined the Bharatiya Janata Party (BJP) in 2008. She was made the chairperson of the Karnataka Women and Child Development Corporation before being removed in 2009. In 2013, she joined the Karnataka Janata Paksha which eventually merged in 2014 with the BJP.

Early life
Born in a Kannada speaking family in Karnataka, Shruti's birth name is Girija. She was credited as Priyadarshini in her first Kannada movie Aasegobba Meesegobba. She was named Shruti by the actor-director Dwarakish who introduced her in a leading role for his film Shruthi in 1990.

Career
Shruthi was in Puttur in her early ages of life. Shruti started her cinema career in Malayalam film Swantham ennu karuthi. Kannada movie Aasegobba Meesegobba as Shivarajkumar's sister role. Later in the year 1990, she acted as heroine in the movie Shruthi directed and produced by Dwarakish. This movie was a successful one running over 25 weeks. Some of the most famous and successful Kannada movies from Shruti are, Shruti, Taayi Illada Tavaru, Veerappa Nayaka, Gauri Ganesha, Bombat Hendthi, Muddina Maava, ‘’Mr. Mahesh Kumar’’, Midida Hrudayagalu. Soon after these films, Shruti was stereotyped for tear jerking roles in many Kannada films. She won her first Karnataka State Film Award for Best Actress for the movie Aagatha (1995) directed by Suresh Heblikar.

In her career spanning for more than two decades, she acted with all the leading male stars in the film industry of her times like Vishnuvardhan, Ambareesh, Tiger Prabhakar, Shiva Rajkumar, Shashikumar, Ramesh Aravind, Jaggesh, Devaraj, Sunil, Abhijeeth, Ram Kumar and others.

In Telugu, most of her films are with the famous comedy hero Rajendra Prasad. She made her debut in Telugu with movie Parugo Parugu against Rajendra Prasad.

Her Tamil film Kalki (1996) directed by the ace director K. Balachander won her the Filmfare Award and also the Tamil Nadu State Award for Best Actress. Navashakthi Vaibhava (2008) was Shruti's 100th film when she began filming in 2003. The film however saw theatrical release five years later. Gowdru turned out to be her 100th film, in which she played the sister of Ramegowda (played by Ambareesh).

Shruti made her small screen debut in the Malayalam serial Sthreethvam aired on Surya TV during 2005. Also, her Tamil daily serial, Karthigai Pengal aired on Sun TV from July 2012.

Shruti was a contestant in the reality television show Bigg Boss Kannada 3, winning the season, in January 2016. In 2017, she appeared as a judge in the comedy television series Majaa Bharatha.

Personal life
Shruti was married to film director S. Mahendar for 11 years and divorced in 2009. Post her divorce, she was linked with Chakravarthy Chandrachud, a journalist-turned-director and they married in June 2013 before the marriage ended in a divorce a year later.

Filmography

Television

TV serials
 2005 :Sthreetvam (Surya TV) - Malayalam
 2012-2013: Karthigai Pengal (Sun TV) - Tamil

Television shows

References

External links
 
 Sruthi at MSI

1976 births
Living people
Actresses in Kannada cinema
Actresses from Karnataka
Actresses in Malayalam cinema
People from Hassan
Actresses in Tamil cinema
Tamil Nadu State Film Awards winners
Filmfare Awards South winners
Participants in Indian reality television series
Reality show winners
Big Brother (franchise) winners
21st-century Indian actresses
Indian television actresses
Indian film actresses
Actresses in Kannada television
Actresses in Malayalam television
Bigg Boss Kannada contestants
Actresses in Telugu cinema
Actresses in Hindi cinema
Actresses in Tamil television